In mathematics, the Bateman polynomials are a family Fn of orthogonal polynomials introduced by .

Bateman polynomials can be defined by the relation

where Pn is a Legendre polynomial. In terms of generalized hypergeometric functions, they are given by 

 generalized the Bateman polynomials to polynomials F with

These generalized polynomials also have a representation in terms of generalized hypergeometric functions, namely

Bateman and Pasternack's polynomials are special cases of the symmetric continuous Hahn polynomials.

Examples
The polynomials of small n read
;
;
;
;
;
;

Properties

Orthogonality

The Bateman polynomials satisfy the orthogonality relation

The factor  occurs on the right-hand side of this equation because the Bateman polynomials as defined here must be scaled by a factor  to make them remain real-valued for imaginary argument.

Recurrence relation

The sequence of Bateman polynomials satisfies the recurrence relation

Generating function

The Bateman polynomials also have the generating function

which is sometimes used to define them.

References

Orthogonal polynomials